Guizhou or Gui Prefecture was a zhou (prefecture) in imperial China centering on modern Zigui County, Hubei, China. In the Yuan dynasty it was briefly called Guizhou Military Commission and Guizhou Route. It existed (intermittently) from 619 until 1912.

Geography
The administrative region of Guizhou in the Tang dynasty is in modern western Hubei. It probably includes modern: 
Under the administration of Yichang:
Zigui County
Xingshan County
Under the administration of Enshi Tujia and Miao Autonomous Prefecture:
Badong County

References
 

Prefectures of the Sui dynasty
Prefectures of the Tang dynasty
Prefectures of Jingnan
Prefectures of the Song dynasty
Prefectures of the Yuan dynasty
Subprefectures of the Ming dynasty
Departments of the Qing dynasty
Former prefectures in Hubei
Populated places established in the 7th century
619 establishments
1912 disestablishments in China